The WAGR J class was a three-member class of 4-6-0 steam locomotives operated by the Western Australian Government Railways (WAGR) between 1892 and 1924 before seeing further use with the State Saw Mills until the early 1930s.

History
The J class engines were built in 1891 by Kitson & Co, Leeds, for the Fremantle to Beverley mail service. They arrived in Western Australia in late 1891 and entered service with the WAGR early the following year. However their fireboxes proved too small and in 1907 they were fitted with Q class boilers.

All three engines were withdrawn in January 1924. They were transferred to the State Saw Mills to haul timber trains and after repairs at the Midland Railway Workshops, J28 arrived at Wuraming in November 1924, J29 at Manjimup in May 1925 and J30 at Holyoake. All were out of use by the early 1930s, and later scrapped.

Namesake
The J class designation was reused in the 1960s when the J class diesel locomotives entered service.

See also

Rail transport in Western Australia
List of Western Australian locomotive classes

References

Notes

Cited works

External links

Kitson locomotives
Railway locomotives introduced in 1892
J WAGR class
3 ft 6 in gauge locomotives of Australia
4-6-0 locomotives